Conrad "Connie" Kalitta (born February 24, 1938) is an American businessman and former drag racing driver, nicknamed "The Bounty Hunter". Kalitta is the CEO of Kalitta Air and the owner of Kalitta Motorsports.

Kalitta was born in Michigan, grew up in Mount Clemens, and was a 1957 graduate of Mount Clemens High School.

He raced from the 1950s through the 1990s.  He was the first driver of a Top Fuel dragster to hit  in a National Hot Rod Association (NHRA) sanctioned eventthe 1964 NHRA U.S. Nationals.

Kalitta teamed up with Shirley Muldowney as the Bounty Hunter and Bounty Huntress, in a pair of Ford Mustangs, hers a Buttera chassis, his a Logghe.

Kalitta was runner-up at the 1963 NHRA Winternationals in Top Gas and at the 1965 NHRA SpringNationals in Top Fuel. His first major event win was the 1967 American Hot Rod Association (AHRA) Winternationals in Scottsdale, Arizona, in a 427ci "cammer"–powered Top Fuel dragster.

Kalitta stepped back from driving in 1971, focusing on growing his airline business. He first returned to the sport as Muldowney's crew chief including her 1977 Top Fuel championship seasonbefore getting back into a Top Fuel dragster in 1978. 

Kalitta won the 1989 NHRA Winternationals, most notable for the fact that the win included him becoming the first ever Top Fuel driver (any sanctioning series) to hit .

Kalitta ultimately won a total of 10 NHRA national events, including the 1994 Gatornationals and U.S. Nationals - his final title.

Kalitta was inducted into the Motorsports Hall of Fame of America in 1992. In 2001, the 50th Anniversary list of National Hot Rod Association Top 50 Drivers, 1951-2000, ranked Kalitta at #21.

Kalitta was played by Beau Bridges, in a lead role, in the Muldowney biography film Heart Like a Wheel (1983).

He is the father of racer Scott Kalitta, killed in a drag racing crash in Old Bridge Township, New Jersey,  in 2008. He is the uncle of racer Doug Kalitta.

On November 14, 2016, Kalitta was honored at the season-ending Mello Yello Awards Ceremony with NHRA's first ever Lifetime Achievement Award.

References

1938 births
Living people
20th-century American businesspeople
21st-century American businesspeople
American airline chief executives
Businesspeople from Michigan
Dragster drivers
International Motorsports Hall of Fame inductees
People from Mount Clemens, Michigan
Racing drivers from Detroit
Racing drivers from Michigan
Sportspeople from Metro Detroit